LRRIQ3 (Leucine-rich repeats and IQ motif containing 3), which is also known as LRRC44, is a protein that in humans is encoded by the LRRIQ3 gene. It is predominantly expressed in the testes, and is linked to a number of diseases.

Gene

Locus 
LRRIQ3 is found on the minus strand of the end of the short arm of human chromosome 1 at 1p31.1.

Overall Structure 
There are a total of 7 exons in the putative sequence of LRRIQ3.

mRNA

Expression  
LRRIQ3 is expressed as 2 primary isoforms, which produce proteins of length 624 amino acids and 464 amino acids respectively. It is expressed at low levels in human and brown rat tissues, with highest expression levels in testes tissue. There are relatively high expression levels in T cells, the epididymis, the kidney, and a number of glands.

Protein

General Characteristics and Compositional Features 
Human protein LRRIQ3 Isoform 1 consists of 624 amino acids, and has a molecular weight of 73.7 kDa. The isoelectric point of LRRIQ3 is 9.73, which suggests that LRRIQ3 is basic at normal physiological pH (~7.4). Additionally, there is strong evidence that human LRRIQ3 localizes to the plasma membrane from antibody staining. LRRIQ3 is rich in lysine residues, with a total of 82 lysines. It is also slightly low on glycines.

Domains and Motifs 
In total, there are 4 conserved domains within LRRIQ3: 3 leucine-rich repeats and 1 IQ calmodulin-binding motif. Leucine-rich repeats are typically involved in protein-protein interactions, and form a characteristic α/β horseshoe fold. An IQ motif provides a binding site for calmodulin (CaM) or CaM-like proteins.

Secondary and Tertiary Structure 
LRRIQ3 is predicted to be mostly alpha-helical in structure, including a long alpha-helical C-terminal domain. It is also predicted to function as a monomer.

Post-translational Modifications 
LRRIQ3 is predicted to undergo many post-translational modifications. These include O-GlcNAcylation, SUMOylation, ubiquitination, and phosphorylation. LRRIQ3 is predicted to have 4 well conserved SUMOylation sites and 1 well conserved ubiquitination site. A representation of these post-translational modifications is shown in the figure below.

Protein Interactions 
There is evidence that LRRIQ3 interacts with a number of proteins from two-hybrid assays and affinity chromatography. The proteins LRRIQ3 interact with include LYN,  NCK2, GNB4, and ABL1. These proteins are associated with cell signalling, cytoskeletal reorganization, and cell differentiation, as well as others.

Homology and evolution

Paralogs and Orthologs 
No paralogs exists for LRRIQ3 in humans. However, there are a number of orthologs, as reported by BLAST, some of which are listed below. The number of years since divergence from the human protein, listed in "million of years ago (MYA)" below, were calculated using TimeTree.

Clinical significance 
LRRIQ3 is linked to a number of cancers. RNA-seq experiments have shown that LRRIQ3 is severely down-regulated (Log2-fold changes between -3.4 and -4.2) in a number of disease states, including pancreatic cancer, colorectal cancer, and breast cancer.

References 

Proteins
Genes on human chromosome 1